Nationalversammlung may refer to

Deutsche Nationalversammlung von 1848-1849 in Frankfurt am Main, see Frankfurt Parliament
 also Preußische Nationalversammlung von 1848, an assembly for Prussia
 Deutsche Nationalversammlung von 1919 in Weimar the parliament of the Weimar Republic, see Weimar National Assembly
 Badische Nationalversammlung von 1919, the assembly for Baden
 Deutschösterreichische Nationalversammlung von 1918, the parliament of the short-lived German Austria